Bishton or Bishopston ( or simply Trefesgob) is a small rural community in the east of the city of Newport, South Wales. It lies in the Llanwern electoral district (ward) and contains the eastern end of Llanwern steelworks, the Underwood estate as well as Bishton itself. The population in the 2001 census was 2,181; dropping to 2,137 in 2011.

The name is said to derive from "Bishop's Town", as the village has been alleged to be the sometime home of the Bishops of Llandaff. Owain Glyndŵr destroyed the palaces at Bishton and Llandaff, from which time the episcopal palace was moved to Mathern. Bishop John Pascall died here of the plague in 1361.

Government 
The area is governed by the Newport City Council and the Bishton community council.

St Cadwaladr's church
Bishton church is the only church is the country dedicated to Cadwaladr, although it is possible that St Mary's Church, Magor also was originally dedicated to him. Cadwaladr was the last Welsh ruler to call himself King of Britain and he earned the title "blessed" for his peaceful disposition. He died of the plague in 664 AD.

The original style of the church was decorated and perpendicular, but in 1760 this was damaged when part of the tower collapsed into the nave. A large amount of building and restoration was required. The north porch was added in the 19th century. Some of the lancet windows are original, but the east window, the west tower window and the two south windows to the nave were installed in the Victorian era. The origins of the chancel arch are unclear and it seems to have been reconstructed from earlier stonework, incorporating four medieval corbel heads: a monk, a nun, a man and a woman. The font is late medieval. The east stained glass window depicts Christ as the Light of the World and as the Good Shepherd and dates from about 1915. The stoup is located near the north door.  The church was designated as a Grade II listed building in 1963.

Use of the Welsh language in services continued at the church until 1828. Sunday Worship is held at 11.00 am, on the 1st and 3rd Sundays and the Local Pastoral Contact is Rev Hilary Prest.

The church is subject to a gateway grant from the National Churches Trust. In 2020 the need for restoration work  primarily to the Tower, was highlighted. A project will develop repair proposals and will include an ecology survey.

References

External links
Bishton, St. Cadwaladers Church, Monumental Inscriptions
Photos of Bishton and surrounding area on geograph.org.uk

Communities in Newport, Wales
Villages in Newport, Wales